The Honda RA108 was the Formula One racing car with which Honda Racing F1 contested the 2008 Formula One season. The car was driven by teammates Jenson Button and Rubens Barrichello. Following the departure of Honda from the sport at the end of 2008 and the sale of the team to team principal Ross Brawn in 2009, the RA108 was the last car produced by the Brackley-based team to bear the Honda name and the last Formula One car powered by a Honda engine until 2015, when Honda re-entered the sport as an engine supplier to power the McLaren MP4-30.

Launch

The car was unveiled at a test in Valencia on 23 January 2008, a week before the car's official launch, driven by Rubens Barrichello. The car was officially unveiled at the team's operational headquarters in Brackley, England.

For the 2008 season, the Honda F1 team named Ross Brawn as team principal and also announced a new deputy technical director in the form of former BMW Sauber chief designer Jörg Zander.

For the 2008 season, the team retained their drivers from the previous two seasons, Jenson Button and Rubens Barrichello. Honda also recruited Alexander Wurz from Williams, although the veteran Austrian had announced his retirement from race driving in 2007, but Wurz could not turn down the prospect of working alongside Ross Brawn. Honda also confirmed that their young driver line up will include 2006 British Formula 3 Champion Mike Conway and Italian Luca Filippi.

2008 season

Testing
The RA108 had been a constant mid to rear end car in 2008 testing with Jenson Button saying the car lacked "driveability"  as the drivers and team adapted the RA108 to new rules. For the 2008 season, the FIA implemented rules that required all teams to use one gearbox for four races and a standard McLaren Electronic Systems ECU that prevents the use of driving aids such as traction control and engine braking. Ross Brawn had already said the team had a better chance for the 2009 Formula One season as the regulations for 2009 would be totally new.

Button commented on how positively the team developed the RA108. At their final week of testing at the Jerez Circuit in Spain, the team added new aerodynamics, with most of the wings being revised. Head of Race and Test Engineering, Steve Clark, believed the car was a clear step forward.

In the testing in Paul Ricard before the Monaco Grand Prix, a second revision of the "dumbo" wings on the nose, first introduced in the Spanish Grand Prix, was introduced.

Gallery

Complete Formula One results
(key)

References

External links

 Honda RA108 Overview
 RA108 technical specifications
 Launch story

Honda Formula One cars
2008 Formula One season cars